The Jupiter barrier is the name for the region of the Solar System where the gravitational influence of Jupiter on passing interstellar and in-system objects such as asteroids and comets attracts those objects to the planet where they are either captured in its orbit or destroyed through impacting the planet. Because of this barrier, Jupiter has been nicknamed the Solar System's "cosmic vacuum cleaner" by astronomers, who have also speculated that the barrier reduces the likelihood of such objects from reaching the inner Solar System with potentially fatal consequences on the smaller planets in the inner Solar System such as nearly, if not completely, destroying all life on Earth.

References
 Mikhail Yakovlevich Marov, Hans Rickman (eds.): Collisional Processes in the Solar System. Springer 2001, pp. 80–82
 Julio A. Fernandez: Comets: Nature, Dynamics, Origin, and their Cosmogonical Relevance. Springer, 2006, pp. 136–138
 Harold F. Levison, Luke Dones, Martin J. Duncan: : The Origin Of Halley-Type Comets: Probing The Inner Oort Cloud
 Luke Dones, Paul R. Weissmann, Harold F. Levison, Michael J. Duncan: Oort Cloud Formation and Dynamics

Dynamics of the Solar System